Uma Jalanta  (Aymara uma water, jalaña to fly, running of water, -nta a suffix) is a mountain in the Khari Khari mountain range of the Bolivian Andes, about 4,760 m (15,617 ft) high. It is situated south east of Potosí in the Potosí Department, Tomás Frías Province, Potosí Municipality. Uma Jalanta lies north-east of Challwiri Lake and the mountain Illimani.

See also 
 Kimsa Waylla

References 

Mountains of Potosí Department